Olga Sosnovska (born 21 May 1972) is a Polish-born UK/US-based actress.

Life and career

Sosnovska was born in Wieluń, Poland. Her family emigrated to England when she was eleven. Sosnovska is perhaps best known in the United States for her role as the Polish businesswoman Lena Kundera on the soap opera All My Children. In 2003, her pairing with Bianca Montgomery (portrayed by Eden Riegel), the daughter of Erica Kane, and their subsequent kiss made television history in the US. This was the first ever same-sex kiss in American soap opera history.

In Britain, she was known for playing Fiona Carter in series 3–4 of the popular series Spooks, which she left mid-series owing to her first pregnancy in 2005.

She is married to the actor Sendhil Ramamurthy (of TV series Heroes fame) and they have one daughter, Halina (b. 2005), and one son, Alex (b. 2008). Sosnovska played a small role in a third-season episode of Heroes. In 2007, Sosnovska played the role of Debbie in Ocean's Thirteen.

Credits
 The Vice Season 1, Episode 4 – (Tanya) 1999
 Jason and the Argonauts – (Atalanta) 2000
 Gormenghast – (BBC) 2000
 Monarch of the Glen (Marie-Helene) 2001
 Take Me UK television miniseries (Andrea Patton) 2001
 All My Children ABC soap opera (Lena Kundera) (2002–2004)
 Law & Order season 13, episode 21 "House Calls" (Velida)
 Law & Order: Criminal Intent season 2, episode 14, "Probability" (Jeanne-Marie Lofficier) 2003
 TV commercials for De Beers diamonds 2004 and Thomasville Furniture (voice-over) 2005
 Spooks (Fiona Carter) (2004–2005)
 Criminal Minds season 2, episode 20 – "Honour Amongst Thieves" – (Natalya Chernus)
 Ocean's Thirteen – (Debbie) 2007
 Weeds – 2011

See also
 Lena Kundera and Bianca Montgomery

References

External links
 

1972 births
Living people
Polish soap opera actresses
Polish emigrants to the United States
Polish emigrants to the United Kingdom
People from Wieluń
Actresses from New Rochelle, New York
21st-century American women